Yves Herbet (born 17 August 1945) is a French former football player and manager, who played as a midfielder.

He was part of France at FIFA World Cup 1966.

External links
 
 

1945 births
Living people
Association football midfielders
French footballers
French expatriate footballers
France international footballers
CS Sedan Ardennes players
R.S.C. Anderlecht players
Red Star F.C. players
Stade de Reims players
AS Nancy Lorraine players
FC Martigues players
1966 FIFA World Cup players
French football managers
Expatriate footballers in Belgium
French expatriate sportspeople in Belgium
AC Avignonnais players
FC Martigues managers
Le Havre AC managers
Angers SCO managers
Fath Union Sport managers